Aditi Sahu is a senior scientist working at the Memorial Sloan Kettering Cancer Centre in New York City.

Early research 
Sahu received the Kishore Vaigyanik Protsahan Yojna (KVPY) fellowship from the Government of India for her undergraduate research.

She received her PhD from Tata Memorial Centre's ACTREC which is the research wing of Tata Memorial Hospital, Mumbai, a cancer care hospital. During her doctoral research, she developed diagnostic methods to screen oral cancer cases noninvasively using Raman spectroscopy and using samples like serum and plasma. During PhD, she received several international travel grants to present her work in US and Europe, following which she was offered a postdoctoral position at MSK.

Current research 
Sahu is working on a diagnostic technology that can image skin cancers deep within through a specialized microscope designed by her supervisor engineer and scientist Dr Milind Rajadhyaksha. Known as Reflectance Confocal Microscope, this method is already being used clinically to image patients at MSK and several centres in US and Europe. Her research on tumor microenvironement in skin cancers was published in Nature Communication.

She is also working on another noninvasive technology called optical coherence tomography. Her research has been published in Journal of Nuclear Imaging and JAMA Derm.

Other
Sahu is a reviewer for several international publications and journals and grant agencies and a faculty for scientific courses that train researchers and doctors in confocal imaging. She is a principal investigator on grants from the Melanoma Research Alliance. She is a Dermatology Fellow (twice) of the Melanoma Research Alliance. She is an advisor to Rekha Rani Memorial Foundation, a non-profit based in Bihar.

She has more than 700 citations of her research publications. She was recently warded with the Ashley Trenner Research Grant Award from the Skin Cancer Foundation, USA in October 2022.

Awards
Her research at MSK was recognized by the Society of Optics and Photonics and was awarded best translational research at SPIE Photonics West Conference, San Francisco.
In 2018, she was selected for the Women in Photonics Workshop in Germany with a full scholarship.

External links

References

Living people
21st-century Indian women scientists
Women scientists from Maharashtra
Scientists from Nagpur
Year of birth missing (living people)